A fast battleship was a battleship which emphasised speed without – in concept – undue compromise of either armor or armament. Most of the early World War I-era dreadnought battleships were typically built with low design speeds, so the term "fast battleship" is applied to a design which is considerably faster. The extra speed of a fast battleship was normally required to allow the vessel to carry out additional roles besides taking part in the line of battle, such as escorting aircraft carriers.

A fast battleship was distinguished from a battlecruiser in that it would have been expected to be able to engage hostile battleships in sustained combat on at least equal terms. The requirement to deliver increased speed without compromising fighting ability or protection was the principal challenge of fast battleship design. While increasing length-to-beam ratio was the most direct method of attaining a higher speed, this meant a bigger ship that was considerably more costly and/or could exceed the naval treaty tonnage limits (where these applied – such as the Washington Naval Treaty shaping naval fleet composition after World War I). Technological advancements such as propulsion improvements and light, high-strength armor plating were required in order to make fast battleships feasible.

Unlike battlecruiser, which became official Royal Navy usage in 1911, the term fast battleship was essentially an informal one. Otherwise, fast battleships were not distinguished from conventional battleships in official documentation; nor were they recognised as a distinctive category in contemporary ship lists or treaties. There is no separate code for fast battleships in the US Navy's hull classification system, all battleships, fast or slow, being rated as "BB".

Origins
Between the origins of the armoured battleship with the French  and the Royal Navy's  at the start of the 1860s, and the genesis of the Royal Navy's Queen Elizabeth class in 1911, a number of battleship classes appeared which set new standards of speed. Warrior herself, at over  under steam, was the fastest warship of her day as well as the most powerful. Due to the increasing weight of guns and armour, this speed was not exceeded until  achieved  under steam. In these late pre-dreadnought designs, the high speed may have been intended to compensate for their lesser staying power, allowing them to evade a more powerful opponent when necessary.

From about 1900, interest in the possibility of a major increase in the speed of Royal Navy battleships was provoked by Sir John ("Jackie") Fisher, at that time Commander-in-Chief of the Mediterranean Fleet. Possibly due to Fisher's pressure, The Senior Officer's War Course of January 1902 was asked to investigate whether a ship with lighter armour and quick-firing medium guns ( calibre), with a  advantage in speed, would obtain any tactical advantage over a conventional battleship. It was concluded that "gun power was more important than speed, provided both sides were determined to fight"; although the faster fleet would be able to choose the range at which it fought, it would be outmatched at any range. It was argued that, provided that the fighting was at long range, an attempt by the faster fleet to obtain a concentration of fire by "crossing the T" could be frustrated by a turn-away, leading to the slower fleet "turning inside the circle of the faster fleet at a radius proportional to the difference in speed" (Figure 1). War games conducted by the General Board of the US Navy in 1903 and 1904 came to very similar conclusions.

Fisher appears to have been unimpressed by these demonstrations, and continued to press for radical increases in the speed of battleships.

Early dreadnoughts
Dreadnought was the first major warship powered by turbines. She also included a number of other features indicating an increased emphasis on speed:
 An improved hull form was developed, with increased length-to-beam ratio.
 The thickness of the main belt was reduced to 11 inches, compared to 12 inches for preceding classes.
 The belt terminated at the upper deck, the usual "upper belt" being deleted
 The forecastle was raised, allowing higher sustained speed in heavy seas.

In the decade following the construction of Dreadnought, the Royal Navy's lead in capital ship speed was eroded, as rival navies responded with their own turbine-powered "dreadnoughts". Meanwhile, in the UK, Fisher continued to press for still higher speeds, but the alarming cost of the new battleships and battlecruisers provoked increasing resistance, both within the Admiralty and from the new Liberal Government that took office in 1906. As a result, a number of potentially significant fast battleship designs failed to achieve fruition.

A notable abortive design was the 22,500-ton "X4" design of December 1905. In the event, the British lead in dreadnought and battlecruiser construction was deemed to be so great that a further escalation in the size and cost of capital ships could not be justified. The X4 design is often described as a "fusion" of the Dreadnought concept with that of the battlecruiser, and it has been suggested that she "would have rendered the s obsolete".

Fisher had his dissent recorded in the board minutes, complaining that "we should not be outclassed in any type of ship".

Queen Elizabeth class
In the event, Fisher's aspirations for faster battleships were not fulfilled until after his retirement in 1910. Following the success of the  gun, the Admiralty decided to develop a  gun to equip the battleships of the 1912 construction programme. However, it was realised that, by dispensing with the amidships turret, it would be possible to free up weight and volume for a much enlarged power plant, and still fire a heavier broadside than the Iron Dukes.

Compared to Fisher's idea of speeding up the entire battlefleet, the advantages of this concept were that there would be no need to compromise the fighting power of the main fleet, and that it would be possible to retain the use of the existing (and still brand-new) 21-knot ships. Up to this time, it had been assumed that the role of a Fast Division could be fulfilled by the battlecruisers, of which there were at that time ten completed or on order. However, it was realised that there were now two problems with this assumption. The first was the likelihood that the battlecruisers would be fully committed in countering the growing and very capable German battlecruiser force. The second was that, as the then First Lord of the Admiralty, Winston Churchill, put it, our beautiful "Cats" had thin skins compared to the enemy's strongest battleships. It is a rough game to pit ... seven or nine inches of armour against twelve or thirteen".

The new battleships would, in fact, be the most heavily armoured dreadnoughts in the fleet. The original 1912 programme envisaged three battleships and a battlecruiser. However, given the speed of the new ships, it was decided that a new battlecruiser would not be needed. Again, no battlecruiser was included, a decision which suggests that the fast battleships were perceived at that time as superseding the battlecruiser concept.

Battle of Jutland
When the fast battleship concept was put to the test at the Battle of Jutland, the Queen Elizabeths had been temporarily attached to Vice-Admiral Beatty's Battlecruiser Fleet at Rosyth (this was to release the Invincible-class battlecruisers of the 3rd Battlecruiser Squadron for gunnery practice at Scapa Flow). The Queen Elizabeths proved an outstanding success, firing with great rapidity, accuracy and effect, while surviving large numbers of hits from German 28.3-centimetre (11 in) and 30.5-centimetre (12 in) shells, and successfully evading the main German battlefleet during the so-called "run to the North". In the fighting,  was severely damaged, suffered a steering failure and was obliged to withdraw, while Malaya suffered a serious cordite fire which nearly caused her loss. However, both ships returned safely to port. This was in notable contrast to the performance of the battlecruisers, of which three (out of nine present) were destroyed by magazine explosions after a relatively small number of hits.

When the main body of the Grand Fleet came into action, the Queen Elizabeths were unable to reach their intended station ahead of the battleline, and instead joined the rear of the line, seeing little further action. Meanwhile, the six surviving battlecruisers assumed the "Fast Division" role, operating ahead of the battleline with some success, exploiting their advantage of speed to damage the head of the German line with virtual impunity.

Jutland was a crippling blow to the reputation of the existing battlecruisers. However, it also reinforced the views of the commander-in-chief, Sir John Jellicoe, that the Queen Elizabeths were too slow to operate with the Battlecruiser Fleet on a permanent basis.

The Admiral class
Even before Jutland, Jellicoe had expressed concern at the lack of new construction for the Battlecruiser Fleet, and the inadequacy of the ships already provided. Early in 1916, he had rejected proposals for a new fast battleship design, similar to the Queen Elizabeth but with reduced draught, pointing out that, with the five new Revenge-class nearing completion, the fleet already had a sufficient margin of superiority in battleships, whereas the absence of battlecruisers from the 1912 and 1913 programmes had left Beatty's force with no reply to the new 12-inch-gunned German battlecruisers. Although two new battlecruisers ( and ) had been ordered in 1914, and were being constructed remarkably quickly, Jellicoe argued that, although their speed was adequate, their armour protection was insufficient. A class of four ships was ordered in mid-1916.

The losses at Jutland led to a reappraisal of the design. As noted above, the British were now convinced that their fast battleships were battleworthy but too slow, and their battlecruisers – even the largest – unfit for sustained battle. As a result, the new ships were radically redesigned in order to achieve the survivability of the Queen Elizabeths while still meeting the requirement for  battlecruisers, although this reworking was flawed. The resulting ships would be the s; at  tons by far the largest warships in the world. In 1917 construction was slowed down, to release resources for the construction of anti-submarine vessels; when it became clear that the threatened new German battlecruisers would not be completed, the last three were suspended and ultimately canceled, leaving only the lead ship, to be completed.

Although the Royal Navy always designated Hood as a battlecruiser, some naval historians such as Antony Preston have characterised her as a fast battleship, as she theoretically had the protection of the Queen Elizabeths while being significantly faster. On the other hand, the British were well aware of the protection flaws remaining despite her revised design, so she was intended for the duties of a battlecruiser and served in the battlecruiser squadrons throughout her career, other than a few months assigned to Force H in 1940. Moreover, the scale of her protection, though adequate for the Jutland era, was at best marginal against the new generation of -gunned capital ships that emerged soon after her completion in 1920, typified by the US  and the Japanese .

Other designs, 1912–1923
During the First World War, the Royal Navy was unique in operating both a Fast Division of purpose-built battleships and a separate force of battlecruisers. However, the 1912–1923 period saw a series of advances in marine engineering which would eventually lead to a dramatic increase in the speeds specified for new battleship designs, a process terminated only by the advent of the Washington Naval Treaty. These advances included:
 small-tube boilers, allowing more efficient transfer of heat from boiler to propulsive steam;
 increases in steam pressure and temperature;
 reduction gearing, which allowed propellers to rotate at a slower, and more efficient, speed than the turbines that powered them;

By the early 1920s, the wealth of the US and the ambition of Japan (the two Great Powers least ravaged by World War I) were forcing the pace of capital ship design. The Japanese appear to have shared Fisher's aspiration for a progressive increase in the speed of the whole battlefleet, influenced partly by their success at outmanoeuvring the Russian fleet at Tsushima, and partly by the need to retain the tactical initiative against potentially larger hostile fleets. The immediate influence of the Nagatos was limited by the fact that the Japanese kept their actual speed a closely guarded secret, admitting to only . As a result, the US Navy, which had hitherto adhered steadily to a  battlefleet, settled for a modest increase to the same speed in the abortive  of 1920.

Officially described as battlecruisers, the G3s were far better protected than any previous British capital ship, and have generally been regarded, like the Kiis, as true fast battleships. The G3s were given priority over the N3s, showing that they were considered fit for the line of battle, and orders were actually placed. However, both the British and the Japanese governments baulked at the monstrous cost of their respective programmes, and ultimately were forced to accede to US proposals for an arms limitation conference; this convened at Washington DC in 1921, and resulted in the 1922 Washington Naval Treaty. This treaty saw the demise of the giant fast battleship designs, although the British used a scaled-down version of the G3 design to build two new battleships permitted under the treaty; the resulting  vessels were completed with the modest speed of 23 knots.

However, construction (begun in 1914–1915) was stopped by the war, and none was ever completed.

Washington Treaty era
The signatories of the Washington Treaty were the US, UK, Japan, France, and Italy; at that time the only nations in the world with significant battlefleets. As a result, the terms of the Washington Treaty, and the subsequent treaties of London 1930 and London 1936 had a decisive effect on the future of capital ship design.

The treaties extended the definition of capital ship to cover all warships exceeding 10,000 tons standard displacement or carrying guns exceeding  calibre; imposed limits on the total tonnage of capital ships allowed to each signatory; and fixed an upper limit of 35,000 tons standard displacement for all future construction. These restrictions effectively signaled the end of the battlecruiser as a distinct category of warship, since any future big-gun cruiser would count against the capital ship tonnage allowance. It also greatly complicated the problem of fast battleship design, since the 35,000-ton limit closed off the most direct route to higher speed, as the increasing length-to-beam ratio would have meant a bigger ship.

Evidence of continued interest in high-speed capital ships is given by the fact that, although the signatories of the treaties were allowed to build  gunned ships as their existing tonnage became due for replacement, most of them passed up the opportunity to do so, preferring instead lighter-armed but faster ships. A British Admiralty paper of 1935 concludes that a balanced design with  speed and 16-inch guns would not be possible within the 35,000 ton limit, since it would be either insufficiently armoured or too slow; it is clear that by this date the  speed of the Nelsons was considered insufficient. The recommended design (never built) was one with nine  guns and speed "not less than ".

The 15-inch-gunned  and es, built in the 1930s by Italy and France respectively, reflect similar priorities to the British.

The  was built in response to the German  (or "pocket battleship") . The  were, in effect, a revival of the late 19th century concept of the commerce-raiding armoured cruiser; long-ranged, heavily armed, and fast enough to evade a conventional capital ship. Likewise, the Dunkerque, can be regarded as a revival of the armoured cruiser's nemesis, the battlecruiser. With 29-knot speed and 330 mm (13 inch) guns, she could operate independently of the fleet, relying on her speed to avoid confrontation with a more powerful adversary, and could easily overtake and overwhelm a Panzerschiff, just as Sturdee's battlecruisers had done to von Spee's cruisers at the Falkland Islands in 1914. On the other hand, as a member of the line of battle, alongside the elderly and slow dreadnoughts that made up the rest of the French battlefleet, the design would make no sense, since her speed would lose its value and neither her armament nor her protection would be at all effective against a modern 16-inch gunned battleship such as Nelson.

The Scharnhorst and Gneisenau were Germany's response to the Dunkerques. Although much larger than the Dunkerques, the Gneisenaus were also not intended for the line of battle; apart from their insufficient armament, set-piece battles against the vastly more numerous Allied battlefleets had no place in Germany's strategic requirements. Instead, the two German ships relied throughout their career on their superlative speed (over 32 knots) to evade the attentions of Allied capital ships. On Gneisenau, the nine 28.3 cm SK C/34 guns in three triple turrets were supposed to be replaced with six 38.1 cm SK C/34 guns in twin turrets, which would have rectified her key weakness, but work was cancelled.

The treaties also allowed the reconstruction of surviving battleships from the First World War, including up to  additional protection against torpedoes, high-altitude bombing and long-range gunnery. In the late 1930s, the Italian and Japanese navies opted for extremely radical reconstructions: in addition to replacing the powerplant in their existing ships, they lengthened the ships by adding extra sections amidships or aft. This had a double benefit; the extra space allowed the size of the powerplant to be increased, while the extra length improved the speed/length ratio and so reduced the resistance of the hull. France, the UK and the US took a less radical approach, rebuilding their ships within their original hulls; boilers were converted to oil-firing or replaced, as were the engines in some cases, but increases in the output of the powerplant were generally canceled out by increases in the weight of armour, anti-aircraft armament and other equipment.

The exception to the European battleship trend was Japan, which refused to sign the Second London Treaty. It rather uncharacteristically settled for a moderate speed of 27 knots, for the sake of high levels of protection and firepower in the -gunned,  displacement .

Due to treaty restrictions, firepower and protection were emphasised first, although both did manage respectable speed increases compared to their World War I contemporaries to be able to operate as carrier escorts. The US signed the Second London Treaty but was quick to invoke an "escalator clause" to increase the main battleship caliber from 14 to 16 inches as Italy and Japan refused to adopt it. This made the North Carolinas somewhat unbalanced ships, being designed to resist shells from the 14-inch guns that it was originally intended to carry, but being up-gunned during construction. The South Dakotas rectified this with protection proof against 16-inch guns. In order to counter the increase in armor weight and stay within tonnage limits, the South Dakota class had to go with a shorter hull to reduce the length of the required protected area, compensating by installing more powerful machinery than in the North Carolinas, and this made the ships somewhat cramped. The balanced 35,000-ton design was achieved by combining highly efficient lightweight double-reduction gear machinery, which reduced the length and volume of the armored citadel, with a sloped internal armored belt, which increased protection without increasing overall armor thickness. With the additional tonnage, the Iowas had new 16-inch guns with a greater maximum range, and they had even more powerful engines and a lengthened hull for a significantly faster speed over the North Carolinas and South Dakotas.

World War II designs
In 1938 the US, UK, and France agreed to invoke the escalator clause of the Second London Treaty, allowing them to build up to 45,000 tons standard. By this time, all three allied nations were already committed to new 35,000-ton designs: the US North Carolinas (two ships) and South Dakotas (four), the British  (five ships) and the French Richelieus (two completed out of four planned, the last of the class, Gascogne, to a greatly modified design).

The UK and US laid down follow-on classes, designed to the new 45,000 ton standard, in 1939 and 1940 respectively. The US succeeded in completing four of the intended six Iowa class, but the British  were not built; two of the planned four units were laid down in the summer of 1939, but neither was completed due to limited capacity to produce the turrets and guns. Her design revised during the war to adopt lessons from the loss of other ships, she was completed in 1946 and was similar in speed to the Lions.

The last US battleship design was the first since 1922 to be entirely free of treaty constraints. The huge s represent a return to "normal American practice" in battleship design, with massive protection, heavy firepower, and moderate speed (28 knots). At 60,500 tons standard, they approached the size of the Yamatos, which they resembled in concept. Five of these ships were ordered, but they were ill-suited to the needs of fast carrier task force operations, and none were laid down.

Summary of "fast battleship" classes

The following classes of warship have been considered to be fast battleships, in accordance with the definition used in this article and/or with contemporary usage. The list includes all new construction of the 1930s and 1940s, along with some reconstructions; this reflects the fact that, while not all of these ships were notably fast by contemporary standards of new construction, they were all much faster than the considerable number of capital ships built in the pre-Treaty era and still in service at that time. All speeds are design speeds, sourced from Conway's; these speeds were often exceeded on trial, though rarely in service.

Royal Navy
  (24 knots): the prototype fast battleship class
  (28 knots)
  (30 knots)

United States Navy
  (28 knots)
  (27.5 knots)
  (33 knots)

Imperial Japanese Navy
  – as reconstructed (30.5 knots). Originally classified as battlecruisers, these ships were reclassified as battleships after their first reconstruction in 1929–1931. Even after a second reconstruction in the late 1930s, they remained relatively weak in armament and protection by Second World War standards.
  – as completed (26.5 knots). Unusually for a Japanese design, the speed was reduced to  when the class was reconstructed in 1934–1936.
  (27 knots)

German Navy
  (also known as the ) (31 knots). These ships were officially designated Schlachtschiffe (battleships). The contemporary Royal Navy termed them "battlecruisers", on the basis of their exceptionally high speed and weak armament.
  (30.8 knots)

French Navy
  (29.5 knots). As with the Gneisenau'' class, the Royal Navy termed these ships "battlecruisers".
  (32 knots)

Royal Italian Navy
  – as reconstructed, 1933–1937 (27 knots)
  – as reconstructed, 1937–1940 (26 knots)
  (30 knots).

References

Bibliography

 
 
 
 
 
 
 
 
 
 

 
 
 

Battleships
Ship types